Tankōbon volumes 41 to 60 encapsulate chapters 414 to 630 of the series. Shogakukan released the twenty volumes between April 9, 2003 and January 12, 2008.



Volume list

References

Case Closed volumes (41-60)